Tritia pygmaea is an extinct species of sea snail, a marine gastropod mollusk in the family Nassariidae, the nassa mud snails or dog whelks.

References

 Stein G. (2019). Die Gattung Tritia Risso, 1826 (Neogastropoda: Nassariidae) im Miozän des Nordseebeckens. Palaeontos. 32: 3-85.
 Lozouet P. (2021). Buccinoidea (Mollusca, Gastropoda, Neogastropoda) de l'Oligocène supérieur (Chattien) du bassin de l'Adour (Sud-Ouest de la France). Cossmanniana. 22: 3-129.

External links
 Schlotheim, E. F. von. (1820). Die Petrefactenkunde auf ihrem jetztigen Standpunkte durch die Beschreibung seiner Sammlung versteinerter und fossiler Überreste des Thier- und Pflanzenreichs der Vorwelt. Becker, Gotha. lxii + 437 pp.

pygmaea
Gastropods described in 1820